Jerom Lastimosa is a Filipino basketball player for the Adamson Soaring Falcons of the University Athletic Association of the Philippines (UAAP). He is known for his clutch playmaking and scoring ability.

Early life 
Lastimosa was born in Dumaguete as the fifth out of six children. His mother is a wet market vendor while his father is a tricycle driver. When he was younger, Lastimosa would play in panalay tournaments. These would be tournaments in which he would play basketball against other amateurs or even ex-pros for an agreed-upon fee, depending on the player's experience and talent level. A scout saw him in the 2017 Unigames (an annual sporting competition for nationwide schools) and recruited him to play for Adamson in Manila.

College career 
Lastimosa first played for the Adamson Soaring Falcons in UAAP Season 81. He started as a backup to Jerie Pingoy. He debuted with six points, three rebounds, and four assists to help Adamson upset the Ateneo Blue Eagles. In their rematch with Ateneo, he led the team with 13 points, but Ateneo won over them. That season, Adamson was second in the standings. He rose to prominence as a player when he converted a clutch triple to force overtime against the UP Fighting Maroons which Adamson survived for a few minutes in the semifinals. However, they lost their twice-to-beat advantage, and UP moved on the Finals.

Lastimosa had more playing time the following season, but still came off the bench for Val Chauca. Against the NU Bulldogs, he had 10 points and the game-winning assist for Lenda Douanga's game-winning three. In a win over the UE Red Warriors, he contributed 16 points, eight rebounds, and six assists. Against UP, he had some turnovers and missed a three with 2.8 seconds left in overtime that led to the Adamson loss. In their rematch against NU, he had an all-around performance of 10 points, nine assists, six rebounds, and four steals. He had a costly offensive foul against UP when he stuck out his leg on a three-ball attempt in their final possession, allowing UP to seal another win over them. They were eliminated from playoff contention in a loss to the FEU Tamaraws. His final averages that season were 8.5 points and 4.1 assists, which was less than what he had expected of himself. 

During the COVID-19 pandemic, when there was no UAAP season, Lastimosa stayed in the Adamson dorms and kept in shape by playing pickup basketball with other athletes who had opted to stay in Adamson. He gained the trust of their new head coach Nash Racela and started trusting his own teammates more as well. In his first game of Season 84, he had 18 points, but got into foul trouble as Adamson lost. He made 11 out of his 14 points in the first quarter, including a three-point shot that gave Adamson a commanding 16–2 cushion halfway through the period that they never looked back from. Against the UST Growling Tigers, he had a near double-double of 16 points and nine rebounds, but it wasn't enough as UST took the win. In their game against UP, he had 18 points, six rebounds, and three assists but missed the game-winning three pointer as the Falcons lost their third straight. At the end of the first round, Adamson had a record of 1–6. In their second round match against FEU, he led Adamson with 17 points, eight rebounds, and had the game-winning assist to rookie teammate Matty Erolon, who made the game-winning three. Against NU, he tallied 17 points on an efficient 6-of-8 shooting clip with five rebounds, four assists, a career-high three blocks, and two steals. In their rematch against UP, he hit a clutch three-pointer and two free throws as Adamson got revenge for losing to UP in the first round. He then set a then career-high of 24 points to go with six rebounds, three assists, and three steals. He led all scorers in the league at the end of the two-round elimination that season. He was also in the top five for free throw percentage. The Falcons however, did not make the Final Four.

Despite getting offers from Korean Basketball League (KBL) teams, Lastimosa opted to stay with Adamson for another year. In a win against UE, he had 11 points, seven rebounds, and no turnovers. He dropped a career-high of 29 points when the Soaring Falcons edged the De La Salle Green Archers in an overtime win in the first round of Season 85 on October 22, 2022. In a loss to UP, he had 19 points, three rebounds, three assists and three steals. He didn't finish the game though, as he stepped on the foot of UP guard JD Cagulangan and had to be subbed out of the game. The injury, which was a dislocated right foot, caused him to miss most of their games in the second round. He returned to playing action against UE. In the next game, he made five of his eight threes for 23 points as Adamson kept its playoff hopes. Against NU, he hit a game-winning three-point shot with 5.5 seconds remaining. He was named co-UAAP Player of the Week along with La Salle's Bettina Binaohan, a women's basketball player. In a do-or-die contest for the last spot in the Final Four, he scored 11 straight points in the third quarter to help the Falcons take the lead against the Archers. He then made two clutch free throws with 12 seconds left in the game as Adamson held on for the win, and got their Final Four spot and a matchup with Ateneo. He finished the game with 22 points (on 4-of-10 shooting from three), and six assists. In their Final Four game against Ateneo, Ateneo's defense limited him to just 10 points on 4-of-15 shooting as Ateneo moved on to the Finals, and their season ended.

A UAAP special award -- PSBankable Player of the Season -- was given to Lastimosa during Season 85 awarding ceremonies on December 14, 2022 after winning four Player of the Game honors.

He will continue to play for the team in his final year in UAAP Season 86.

Off the court 
Lastimosa is a brand endorser of Anta Philippines.

References 

Year of birth missing (living people)
Living people
Adamson Soaring Falcons basketball players
People from Dumaguete
Point guards
Sportspeople from Negros Oriental